Beketaten(14th century BCE) was an ancient Egyptian princess of the 18th Dynasty. Beketaten is considered to be the youngest daughter of Pharaoh Amenhotep III and his Great Royal Wife Tiye, thus the sister of Pharaoh Akhenaten. Her name means "Handmaid of Aten".

Family 
Beketaten was most likely the youngest daughter of Amenhotep III and Tiye. This would mean their other children were her siblings, including Prince Thutmose, the Pharaoh Akhenaten, Sitamun, Isis, Henuttaneb, and Nebetah. Some scholars have speculated that Nebetah was identical with Beketaten. However, no evidence proves that they are the same person.

It has also been suggested that she might be the daughter of Akhenaten and his secondary wife, Kiya. Kiya is shown on a few occasions with a princess whose name ends in -aten. However, the full name of the princess has been lost. It has been speculated that this daughter is Beketaten partially because Beketaten was never named King's Sister in the scenes from Amarna, but only King's Bodily Daughter. After the death of her mother, Beketaten may have been raised by Tiye. Because a wine docket of Year 13 mentions Beketaten, it has been proposed that she inherited Kiya's estates after her death.

Appearance in Amarna Tomb 1 

Beketaten is only known from the Amarna tomb of Huya, who was Queen Tiye's steward. She is depicted in two scenes. In the first, Queen Tiye is shown seated opposite Pharaoh Akhenaten and Queen Nefertiti. In one scene Beketaten is shown seated on a small chair next to her mother Tiye, and in the other banquet scene Beketaten is shown standing next to Tiye. On the east wall of Huya's tomb Akhenaten is shown leading his mother Tiye to a temple. They are accompanied by Beketaten as they enter the temple.

The lintel on the North Wall shows a depiction of the two royal families. On the right side Amenhotep III is shown seated opposite Queen Tiye, who is accompanied by the princess Beketaten. Three female attendants are shown behind Tiye.

Death and Association with The Younger Lady 
It is likely that she died young since she is not mentioned in the historical records after Queen Tiye's death. She has been considered as a candidate for the identity of the mummy known as The Younger Lady. The Younger Lady has been identified as daughter of Amenhotep III and Tiye and the mother of Tutankhamun.

References

Princesses of the Eighteenth Dynasty of Egypt
14th-century BC Egyptian women
Children of Amenhotep III